Mikhail Elgin and Igor Zelenay were the defending champions but they returned with different partners.

Elgin played with Egor Gerasimov while Zelenay played with Aliaksandr Bury.

Aliaksandr Bury and Igor Zelenay won the title by defeating Konstantin Kravchuk and Philipp Oswald 6–2, 4–6, [10–6] in the final.

Seeds

Draw

Draw

References
 Main Draw

Kazan Kremlin Cup - Doubles
Kazan Kremlin Cup
2016 in Russian tennis